Shantanu Biswas (25 October 1954 – 12 July 2019) was a Bangladeshi dramatist, playwright, stage director, singer-songwriter and composer. He has written and directed several full-length plays between 1975 and 2019, where he performed as an actor in more than sixteen plays. His major successes include Informer (1982), and Julius Ceasar er Shesh Shaat Din (The Last Seven Days of Julius Caesar) (1987).

Born in Chittagong (now Chattogram), Biswas spent his whole life in the port city, where he struggled to establish himself as a dramatist and musician. He has released five solo and two mixed albums. He made his debut album Chirkut in 2009. His last solo Sritir Shohore was released posthumously in 2019 by G-Series. His music as blended with modern poetry, and lyrics with diverse tunes covering different genres of world music.

Early life and career
Shantanu Biswas was born on 25 October 1954 in Chittagong, East Pakistan (now Bangladesh). He attended Saint Placid's High School and Government Hazi Mohammad Mohsin College in Chattogram. In 1971, the Bangladesh Liberation War started, and Biswas moved to India and worked with the Swadhin Bangla Betar Kendra as its youngest artist. After the war, he returned to Chattogram, finished his education, and was soon employed at the conglomerate Ispahani Limited, where he served as the Chief Operational Officer of the Tea Department until his death in 2019. He was also chairman of Tea Traders Association of Bangladesh (TTAB).

Theater
Biswas had an interest in drama and theatre from his young age. He got his start in theatre as an actor; later on, he began his career as an original playwright, director, and translating foreign plays into Bengali, most of which he also directed. In 1974, Biswas worked with the theatre group Gonayon and later with Angon in 1976. Kalo Golaper Desh is the first play written by him. Then he wrote Doptori Raj Dawptore and Nobojonmo. In 1982, he started his theatre group, Kal Purush Natto Shomproday. His prominent plays include Informer (1982), which was staged internationally and adapted by multiple other groups, as well as Julius Ceasar er Shesh Shaat Din (The Last Seven Days of Julius Caesar) in 1987. 

Biswas translated several foreign plays into Bengali, such as Manush O Niyoti from the original play by George Bernard Shaw, Matri Chorit original play by Alan Ayckbourn, Prarthi translated from original play Applicant (1959) by Harold Pinter and Khola Hawa original play by N. F. Simpson. He was also the editor of a theatre magazine, Proscenium, since 1983.

Music career
Biswas's first album, Jhinuk Jhinuk Mon, was released in 2007 from Impress Audio Vision Ltd. It was a mixed album with fellow Bangladeshi singer Arunima Islam. In 2008, he released a second mixed album, Bawhoman, along with Bappa Mazumder.

Biswas released his first solo album, Chirkut in 2009, which attained widespread popularity with its singles "Dekhechi Shada Kalo Shari" and "Chirkute Dekhi Chotto Kore Lekha". His second solo Postman was released on 9 July 2011 from Agniveena. His third solo Khorkuto was released on 29 March 2014 from Agniveena. This album includes 11 tracks where all the lyrics and tunes were composed by Shantanu himself. Bappa Mazumder and Sudipto Saha have coordinated the music of the album. His fourth studio album Shob Tomader Jonno was released in 2015. His fifth and last solo Sritir Shohore was released posthumously on 5 October 2019 by G-Series.

Personal life and death
Biswas was married to fellow stage-actress Shubhra Biswas in 1984 and has two daughters.

On 12 July 2019, he died from cardiac arrest in United Hospital, Dhaka, Bangladesh. As a lifelong humanist philosopher, he donated his body for medical research to the Anatomy Department, Chittagong Medical College, the first-ever donated cadaver in the College's entire history.

Legacy
After his death, the Drama Department of the Chittagong University launched a scholarship program dedicated to Biswas, named, "Nattojon Shantanu Biswas Smriti Britti" for students with outstanding academic results in the field of drama and theatre.

He has also received several awards, most prominently the Zia Haider Memorial Drama Medal in 2013.

Dramatography

Discography

Studio albums

Mixed albums

Bibliography
Two Plays: Informer and Bhoboghure (2002)
Shantanu Bishash-er Charti Natok (2018)
Nattotroyie (2019) 
Khirer Putul (2016) 
Gaaner Kobita Khola Pith (2018)
Proscenium (2020, July), edited, posthumous,

References

External links

1954 births
2019 deaths
20th-century dramatists and playwrights
21st-century dramatists and playwrights
Bangladeshi dramatists and playwrights
Bangladeshi male stage actors
Bangladeshi stage actors
21st-century Bangladeshi male singers
21st-century Bangladeshi singers
21st-century Bangladeshi male musicians
Bangladeshi male singer-songwriters
Bangladeshi songwriters
Bangladeshi lyricists
Bengali-language lyricists
Bangladeshi composers
G-Series (record label) artists
People from Chittagong District
National University, Bangladesh alumni